Hands Up is the second studio album by South Korean boy band, 2PM. The album was released in digital format on June 20, 2011 and the physical format on June 21, 2011 also the special limited edition on June 23, 2011. The Japanese edition of the album include a 24-page photo book.

Music videos
A teaser for the music video of "HANDS UP", the lead single of their album, was released on June 14, 2011 on the 2PM's official YouTube account. The full music video was released on June 20, 2011 along with the album.

They released a music video for "HANDS UP (East4A Mix)" on July 14, 2011. They released 2 music videos for "HOT" and "Give It To Me" to promote the movie Blind. "Give It To Me" was written by Junho and released on July 19. "HOT" was written by Jun. K and was released on July 25, both on the 2PM's official YouTube account.

Track listing

Charts and certifications

Album

Singles

Sales and certifications

Release history

References

External links 
 
 
 
 
 
 
 Official Website

2011 albums
2PM albums
JYP Entertainment albums
Kakao M albums
KMP Holdings albums
Korean-language albums